The 2023 Salzburg state election will take place in the Austrian state of Salzburg on 23 April 2023.

Background  
In the 2018 Salzburg state election, the ÖVP won with 37.8% of the vote, followed by the SPÖ with 20.0%. The FPÖ received 18.8% of the vote, the Greens received 9.3%, and NEOS received 7.3%. 

The ÖVP won 15 of the 36 seats in the Landtag (+4), the SPÖ 8 seats (-1), the FPÖ 7 seats (+1), the Greens 3 seats (-4) and NEOS also 3 seats (+3). The Team Stronach, which received 3 seats in the 2013 Salzburg state election, didn't run again. 

Turnout was 65.0%, a record low. 

After the election, the ÖVP entered into a coalition with the Greens and NEOS, the first of its kind in Austria, and sometimes called "Dirndl"-coalition.

Electoral system 
The 36 seats of the Landtag of Salzburg are elected via open list proportional representation in a two-step process. The seats are distributed between six multi-member constituencies, representing the six administrative districts of the state: Stadt Salzburg (City of Salzburg), Salzburg-Umgebung (Flachgau), Hallein (Tennengau), Sankt Johann (Pongau), Tamsweg (Lungau) and Zell am See (Pinzgau). For parties to receive any representation in the Landtag, they must either win at least one seat in a constituency directly, or clear a 5 percent state-wide electoral threshold. Seats are distributed in constituencies according to the Hare quota, with any remaining seats allocated using the D'Hondt method at the state level, to ensure overall proportionality between a party's vote share and its share of seats.

Eligibility 
Austrian citizens who are at least 16 or older on election day and who have their main residence in Salzburg on election day are eligible to vote. Eligible voters must be 18 or older to run as candidates in the election and to get elected.

Contesting parties 
The table below lists parties represented in the previous Landtag.

Parties in need of signatures + who are not represented in the Landtag

Parties not represented in the Landtag of Salzburg had until 1 March 2023 (1pm) to submit the necessary paperwork and either the signatures of 3 members of the Landtag of Salzburg, or 600 valid signatures of eligible voters in Salzburg, to appear on the ballot statewide. 

The number of necessary signatures varied between 80 and 120, depending on the size of the 6 districts in terms of voting-eligible population. It was therefore possible for new parties to contest the election in individual districts only as well, rather than statewide. 

NEOS, which won 3 seats in the Landtag in the 2018 election, also needed to collect 600 signatures - because one of their members switched to the ÖVP during the term, leaving them only with 2 seats. NEOS announced they won't ask other factions to support their candidacy, collecting the 600 signatures instead. The party received more than the 600 necessary signatures and will be on the ballot statewide.

The following parties also managed to collect enough signatures by the deadline and will be on the ballot statewide:

 Communist Party of Austria - (KPÖ)
 MFG Austria – People Freedom Fundamental Rights - (MFG)
 Wir sind Salzburg (We are Salzburg) - (WIRS) - (Note: the party was created by former members of the MFG)

The final announcement of qualified parties was released by the state election commission on 13 March 2023, after verification of the submitted signatures and election documents.

Parties that retracted their candidacy

 Salzburg Beer Party - (SBP) - (Note: initially intended to be only on the ballot in the district of Flachgau; the SBP is not associated with the Austrian Beer Party (BIER). On 9 March 2023, it was announced that the SBP was just an art project. The party retracted their candidacy and subsequently won't be approved by the state election commission, therefore won't participate in the election.)

Campaign 
Both the Greens and NEOS officially started their election campaigns on 24 February 2023. Both ruled out a coalition with the FPÖ after the election, with the Greens even warning of a FPÖ participation in the next government on their campaign posters. Both the Greens and NEOS remain open about entering another government with each other and with the ÖVP, but said the ÖVP must "change" and become "more open" towards Green policies such as combating climate change or the fight against corruption, which was also emphasized by NEOS. Each party plans to spend 500.000€ on its campaign. The bigger parties ÖVP, SPÖ and FPÖ will start their campaigns in March.

Opinion polling

Results

Notes

References 

State elections in Austria
Salzburg (state)
2023 elections in Austria